The Indios del Bóer are a professional baseball team based in Managua, Nicaragua competing in the Nicaraguan Professional Baseball League. Their home games are played at the Dennis Martínez National Stadium. They have won the Nicaraguan league eight times. The team, as well as their fans, are commonly referred to as La Tribu or the tribe.

History

Indios del Bóer were established in 1905, simply as Bóer. The team's name comes from an incorrect spelling of boers, that was chosen to embody the team's values as fighters. The Indios' first uniform was: white cap, black shirt, white pants and black socks. 

The club was founded by Carter Donaldson, American consul in Nicaragua, his son Agustín Donaldson and Francisco Caparro. Caparro also played for the Indios as pitcher and was the team's first captain. 

The team has previously had the following names: Búfalos del Bóer, Bóer-Victoria and Bóer-Managua.

Roster

References

Nicaraguan Professional Baseball League